Radcliffe-cum-Farnworth was a parliamentary constituency centred on the towns of Radcliffe and Farnworth in Lancashire.  It returned one Member of Parliament (MP) to the House of Commons of the Parliament of the United Kingdom, elected by the first past the post system.

History 
This area had previously been represented as part of South East Lancashire division. Under the Redistribution of Seats Act 1885, the constituency was created for the 1885 general election and was abolished for the 1918 general election.

Boundaries
The South East Lancashire, Radcliffe-cum-Farnworth Division was defined in the 1885 legislation as consisting of the parishes of Farnworth, Kearsley, Little Hulton and Pilkington (including Whitefield and Unsworth) and the parish of Radcliffe except the area in the Municipal Borough of Bury.

At the next redistribution of seats in 1918, the constituency was split between two new seats: Farnworth (which included Little Hulton and Kearsley) and Heywood and Radcliffe (which took in Unsworth and Whitefield).

Members of Parliament

Elections

Elections in the 1880s

Elections in the 1890s

Elections in the 1900s

Elections in the 1910s

General Election 1914–15:

Another General Election was required to take place before the end of 1915. The political parties had been making preparations for an election to take place and by the July 1914, the following candidates had been selected; 
Liberal: Theodore Taylor
Unionist:

References

Sources
 South Lancashire constituencies map, including Radcliffe-cum-Farnworth.

Parliamentary constituencies in North West England (historic)
Constituencies of the Parliament of the United Kingdom established in 1885
Constituencies of the Parliament of the United Kingdom disestablished in 1918
Farnworth